The Regular Reserve is the component of the military reserve of the British Armed Forces whose members have formerly served in the "Regular" (full-time professional) forces. (Other components of the Reserve are the Volunteer Reserves and the Sponsored Reserves.) The Regular Reserve largely consists of ex-Regular personnel who retain a statutory liability for service and are liable to be recalled for active military duty "in case of imminent national danger or great emergency". It also consists of a smaller number of ex-Regulars who serve under a fixed-term reserve contract (similar in nature to the Volunteer Reserves) and are liable for reporting, training and deploying on operations. 

Since April 2013, Ministry of Defence publications no longer report the entire strength of the Regular Reserve, instead, only Regular Reserves serving under the fixed-term reserve contract are counted. As of 2014, they had a strength of 45,110 personnel. Of those, approximately 2,450 were serving alongside the Regular military in active service.

Regular Reserves

Royal Fleet Reserve
The Royal Fleet Reserve consists of ex-Regulars serving under a fixed-term reserve contract. As of 2014, they have a strength of 7,960 personnel.

Army Reserve (Regular)
The Regular Reserve of the British Army was originally created in 1859 by Secretary of State for War Sidney Herbert, and re-organised under the Reserve Force Act, 1867. Prior to this, a soldier was generally enlisted into the British Army for a 21 year engagement, following which (should he survive so long) he was discharged as a Pensioner. Pensioners were sometimes still employed on garrison duties, as were younger soldiers no longer deemed fit for expeditionary service who were generally organised in invalid units or returned to the regimental depot for home service. The cost of paying pensioners, and the obligation the government was under to continue to employ invalids as well as soldiers deemed by their commanding officers as detriments to their units were motivations to change this system. The long period of engagement also discouraged many potential recruits. The long service enlistments were consequently replaced with short service enlistments, with undesirable soldiers not permitted to re-engage on the completion of their first engagement. The size of the army also fluctuated greatly, increasing in war time, and drastically shrinking with peace. Battalions posted on garrison duty overseas were allowed an increase on their normal peacetime establishment, which resulted in their having surplus men on their return to a Home station. Consequently, soldiers engaging on short term enlistments were enabled to serve several years with the colours and the remainder in the Regular Reserve, remaining liable to recall to the colours if required. Among the other benefits, this thereby enabled the British Army to have a ready pool of recently-trained men to draw upon in an emergency. The name of the Regular Reserve (which for a time was divided into a First Class and a Second Class) has resulted in confusion with the Reserve Forces, which were the pre-existing part-time, local-service home-defence forces that were auxiliary to the British Army (or Regular Force), but not originally part of it: the Honourable Artillery Company, Yeomanry, Militia (or Constitutional Force) and Volunteer Force. These were consequently also referred to as Auxiliary Forces or Local Forces.

Today, the Army Reserve (Regular) of the British Army consists of Regular Reserves serving under a fixed-term reserve contract and are by far the largest of the armed forces Regular Reserves. As of 2014 they numbered 30,030 personnel and are divided into two categories. Category A is mandatory, with ex-Regulars automatically falling into this category upon leaving Regular service. Category D is voluntary, for ex-Regulars who are no longer required to serve in category A, but wish to continue, this normally lasts until the age of 55. Ex-Regulars in both categories serve under the fixed-term reserve contract.

The Army Reserve (Regular) is distinct from and should not be confused with the British Army's Volunteer Reserve force of the same name, the Army Reserve.

Air Force Reserve
The Air Force Reserve consists of ex-Regulars serving under a fixed-term reserve contract. As of 2014, they have a strength of 7,120 personnel.

Other Regular Reserves and the Reserve Forces Act 1996
The following elements of the Regular Reserve are no longer included or counted in Ministry of Defence publications and statistics on Reserve Forces and Cadets.

Regular Reserve – Long Term Reserve
British Army – "All male (but not female) soldiers who enlisted before 1 Apr 97 have a statutory liability for service in the Long Term Reserve until their 45th birthday. Men and women who enlisted on or after 1 Apr 97 serve for a total of 18 years or until age 55, in the Regular Reserve and Long Term Reserve combined from the date of completion of their full time Colour service. Long Term Reservists may only be recalled under Section 52 of the Reserve Forces Act (RFA) 1996, for home or overseas service, in case of imminent national danger or great emergency."

Regular Reserve – Pensioners
British Army – "Until age 60 those in receipt of an Army pension may be recalled under Section 52 of the RFA 96 for home or overseas service, in case of imminent national danger or great emergency. Present policy is not to recall a pensioner who is over the age of 55."

See also
Volunteer Reserve
Military reserve force
Reserve Forces Act 1996
Sponsored Reserves

Notes

References

External links
gov.uk MoD – reserves and cadet strengths, April 2014
Reserve Forces Act 1996

Reserve forces of the United Kingdom